The Martyrs of Christ the King Cathedral (also Piedras Negras Cathedral) is a Catholic church that serves as the cathedral of the city of Piedras Negras to the northeast of the state of Coahuila in Mexico, near the border with the Texan city of Eagle Pass.

In March 2008, the Martyrs of Christ the King Cathedral, home of the Diocese of Piedras Negras, was headed by the Apostolic Nuncio Christophe Pierre, the Cardinal of Monterrey Francisco Robles Ortega and seventeen bishops, in addition to the presence of the hierarchy of the Catholic Church in Mexico.

See also
Roman Catholicism in Mexico
Christ the King

References

Roman Catholic cathedrals in Mexico
Buildings and structures in Coahuila